Events in the year 1983 in Germany.

Incumbents
President – Karl Carstens 
Chancellor – Helmut Kohl

Events
 18 February - 1 March - 33rd Berlin International Film Festival
 6 March - West German federal election, 1983
 16 March – The Ismaning radio transmitter (last wooden radio tower in Germany) is demolished.　
 29 March - The second cabinet led by Helmut Kohl is sworn in.
 23 April - Germany in the Eurovision Song Contest 1983
 22 May - 1983 Rhein-Main Starfighter crash
 22 July - Launch of the Ford Orion, saloon version of the current front-wheel drive Escort, which will be built in Cologne, West Germany, as well as in British factories.
 19 September - The MK2 Volkswagen Golf is unveiled at the Frankfurt Motor Show, spelling the end of MK1 Golf production after almost a decade. It will be launched in left-hand drive form imminently, and in right-hand drive form from March 1984.
December - The new Volkswagen Golf manages third place in the European Car of the Year award, which is won by the Fiat Uno from Italy, with second place being attained by the Peugeot 205 from France.

Births

11 January – Adrian Sutil, German Formula One driver
17 January 
 Johannes Herber, basketball player  
 Alexander Meier, German football player
21 January – Moritz Volz, German footballer  
28 April – Andreas Kleinheinz, German ice hockey player
3 June – Janine Habeck, German model 
12 June – Alexander Pipa, German rugby player
24 June – Albert, 12th Prince of Thurn and Taxis, German aristocrat and businessman
26 June – D.L. Lang, German-American poet
19 July – Prince Ernst August of Hanover
24 August – Marcel Goc, German ice hockey player
3 September – Alexander Klaws, German singer and winner of Deutschland sucht den Superstar (season 1) and Let's Dance (German season 7)
3 September – Eko Fresh, German rapper
23 September – Lucas Prisor, German actor
1 November – Micaela Schäfer, German model and actress
2 November – Andreas Bourani, German singer
8 November – Katharina Molitor, German athlete
11 November – Philipp Lahm, German football player
16 November – Britta Steffen, German swimmer
29 November – Aylin Tezel, German actress

Deaths

7 January – Rudolf Wolters, German architect (born 1903)
27 April – Georg von Holtzbrinck, German publisher (born 1909)
1 June – Anna Seghers, German writer (born 1900)
6 June – Hans Leip, German poet and playwright (born 1893)
18 June – Marianne Brandt, German industrial designer (born 1893)
19 June – Georg Diederichs, German politician (born 1900)
10 July – Werner Egk, German composer (born 1901)
12 July – Erich Warsitz, German pilot (born 1906)
19 July – Erik Ode, German actor (born 1910)
24 July – Nicolaus von Below, adjutant to Adolf Hitler (born 1907)
6 August – Klaus Nomi, German singer and performance artist (born 1944)
12 August – Theodor Burchadi, German admiral (born 1892)
9 October – Herbert Weichmann, German politician (born 1896)
18 October – Cornelius Rost, German soldier (born 1919)

See also
1983 in German television

References

 
Years of the 20th century in Germany
1980s in Germany
Germany
Germany